The second of three 1949 Buenos Aires Grand Prix (official name: III Gran Premio de Eva Duarte Perón), was a Grand Prix motor race held at the Palermo street circuit in Buenos Aires on February 6, 1949. The race was shortened from 35 laps due to rain.

Classification

References

Buenos Aires Grand Prix (II)
Buenos Aires Grand Prix (II)
Buenos Aires Grand Prix